4003 Schumann, provisional designation , is a carbonaceous asteroid from the outer region of the asteroid belt, approximately 35 kilometers in diameter.

The asteroid was discovered on 8 March 1964, by German astronomer Freimut Börngen at the Karl Schwarzschild Observatory in Tautenburg, Eastern Germany. It was named after German composer Robert Schumann.

Orbit and classification 

Schumann orbits the Sun in the outer main-belt at a distance of 3.1–3.7 AU once every 6 years and 4 months (2,316 days). Its orbit has an eccentricity of 0.09 and an inclination of 5° with respect to the ecliptic. The first precovery was obtained at Heidelberg Observatory in 1933, extending the asteroid's observation arc by 31 years prior to its discovery.

Physical characteristics 

Schumann has been characterized as a dark C-type asteroid.

Diameter and albedo 

According to the space-based surveys carried out by the Japanese Akari satellite and NASA's Wide-field Infrared Survey Explorer with its NEOWISE mission, Schumanns surface has an albedo of 0.04 and 0.07, and an estimated diameter of 35.0 and 38.2 kilometers, respectively. The Collaborative Asteroid Lightcurve Link assumes a standard albedo for carbonaceous bodies of 0.057, and calculates a diameter of 32.0 kilometers.

Rotation period 

Several photometric lightcurves of Schumann gave a rotation period between 5.60 and 5.75 hours with a brightness amplitude in the range of 0.20 to 0.23 in magnitude.

Naming 

This minor planet was named in honor of German composer of the Romantic era, Robert Schumann (1810–1856), known for his Lieder, chamber works and cello concerti. He was born in Zwickau, in proximity to the discovering observatory in Tautenburg. The official naming citation was published by the Minor Planet Center on 20 May 1989.

References

External links 
 Asteroid Lightcurve Database (LCDB), query form (info )
 Dictionary of Minor Planet Names, Google books
 Asteroids and comets rotation curves, CdR – Observatoire de Genève, Raoul Behrend
 Discovery Circumstances: Numbered Minor Planets (1)-(5000) – Minor Planet Center
 
 

004003
Discoveries by Freimut Börngen
Named minor planets
19640308